Patrick Wallace (born 20 September 1969) is a former professional snooker player from  Dungannon in Northern Ireland. During his career, which lasted seventeen years from 1994 to 2011, he won two non-ranking titles, and notably was a quarter-finalist in the 2001 World Championship.

He attained his highest world ranking, 34th, for the 2001–02 season, but dropped off the main tour several times, latterly in 2011; thereafter, he retired from professional snooker and resumed his career at amateur level, where he remains one of Northern Ireland's top players.

Career

Professional
Wallace turned professional in 1994, and in his first season reached the last 32 of the Benson & Hedges Championship, where he lost 1–5 to Rod Lawler. He won four qualifying round matches to appear in the last 128 at the 1995 International Open, but there his progress was halted by a 2–5 defeat to Yasin Merchant of India.

In his second season on the main tour, he improved his personal best performance, recording five victories in the 1995 Grand prix before losing 3–5 in the last 96 to Mark King. He was invited to participate in the 1996 Malta Masters, a sixteen-man event, where he won his first match 4–3 against Tony Drago, but Martin Dziewialtowski beat him 4–1 in their quarter-final.

Wallace did not progress in the following season, dropping from the tour in 1997. However, he beat Shaun Murphy 6–4 in the final of Event 4 of the UK Tour in 1998 to secure his immediate return, and at the 1999 Welsh Open, he recorded a last-16 finish for the first time in his career. Wallace beat Mark Miller, Wayne Brown, Quinten Hann, Ken Doherty, and Tony Chappel, and held James Wattana to 2–2 before losing 2–5.

This performance was sufficient for Wallace's ranking to rise from 150th to 84th in time for the 1999–2000 season, and although that season heralded no great results, his run to the final qualifying round of the 2000 World Championship - where eventual quarter-finalist Dominic Dale beat him 10–8 - saw him enter the top 64 for the first time, finishing at 59th.

The 2000/2001 season was also largely quiet for Wallace, a last-48 showing in the UK Championship, where he again lost to Dale, his best until that season's World Championship. Entering at the last-96 stage, he beat Nick Walker 10–2 and Simon Bedford 10–9 to reach the final qualifying round. Wallace trailed Joe Perry 0–2 but recovered to win convincingly, 10–4, and thus reached the final stages at the Crucible Theatre for the first time.
At the Crucible, he was drawn against Alan McManus and, against expectations, Wallace prevailed 10–2; he then won his next match 13–5 against Mark King to reach the quarter-finals. Drawn to play his friend and fellow countryman Joe Swail, this match proved a tighter affair; Wallace led 6–2 and 7–4 but could not prevent an 11–13 loss. Assured of £36,500 in prize money, he went into the 2001/2002 season ranked 34th, his highest-ever position.

The season did not reflect his impressive result at the World Championship, as he could not progress beyond the last 48 in any of the eleven tournaments he entered, and 2002–03 was no better; although he again came within one win of reaching the Crucible, Ali Carter beat him 10–8, and his ranking for the 2003/2004 season dropped to 50th.

In the years that followed, Wallace struggled for results, his ranking eventually falling to 74th in the 2005/2006 season, and accordingly he was relegated from the tour again in 2006.
He won the Northern Ireland Amateur Championship for the third time in 2007, defeating Joe Meara 10–5 in the final, and received a wildcard to compete again on the main tour as the Northern Ireland nomination; however, he could not recapture the stellar form he showed in 2001, and from this point until his latest relegation from the tour in 2011, he never broke back into the top 64. He remains the only player ever to have reached the quarter-finals of the World Championship in their only appearance at the televised stages.

After retiring in 2011, Wallace participated in the qualifying rounds for the 2012 World Snooker Championship. He defeated John Parrott 5–0 in the first preliminary qualifying round before beating Joe Delaney 5–2 in the second preliminary round; however, he was defeated in the second qualifying round 10–9 by Yu Delu.

Amateur
Since retiring as a professional Wallace has continued as an amateur, and has won the Northern Ireland Championship a record eight times; he had been holding the title between 2012 and 2016.

In 2016 Wallace received an invitation as a wildcard to the 2016 Northern Ireland Open, where he lost in the first round 2–4 to Michael Georgiou. Having qualified for the 2018 World Seniors Championship, he came within one frame of winning the title, overcoming Simon Dent 3–0, Rhydian Richards 3–1 and Jonathan Bagley 3–2, but surrendered a 3–1 lead against fellow qualifier Aaron Canavan in the final to lose 3–4.

Outside snooker
Wallace is an accountancy graduate from Queen's University Belfast (1992). He captained the Queen's team to the British Universities title at Leeds in 1992.

Performance and rankings timeline

Career finals

Non-ranking finals: 4 (2 titles)

Amateur finals: 9 (8 titles)

References

External links

Pro Snooker Blog profile

1969 births
Living people
Snooker players from Northern Ireland
People from Dungannon
Sportspeople from County Tyrone
Alumni of Queen's University Belfast